Pandiyoda Galatta Thaangala is a 2016 Indian Tamil-language horror comedy film directed by ST Gunasekaran and starring Nithin Sathya and Raksha Raj while Mayilsamy plays the titular role.

Plot 
Pandi, a monkey, becomes a ghost and disturbs people around him.

Cast

Music 
The music of the film is composed by Sugumar.

Reception 
M. Suganth of The Times of India gave the film a rating of 1/5 and said that "Forget the ghost, the only atrocity that we find here is the existence of this thoroughly uninspiring film". A critic from iFlicks opined that "Pandiyoda Galatta Thangala leaves us wanting to leave early". A critic from The Times of India Samayam gave the film a rating of 1.5/5 and criticised its writing in regards to other horror flicks. Critics from Maalaimalar and Dinamalar called the film "unbearable".

References 

2016 films
2016 comedy horror films
Indian comedy horror films
2010s Tamil-language films